Daguerre Glacier is a glacier on Kyiv Peninsula, Graham Land, which joins with Niepce Glacier and flows into Lauzanne Cove, Flandres Bay. It was shown on an Argentine government chart of 1954, and named by the UK Antarctic Place-Names Committee in 1960 for Louis Daguerre, a French painter and physicist who, with J.N. Niepce, invented the daguerreotype process of photography perfected in 1839.

References
 SCAR Composite Gazetteer of Antarctica
 

Glaciers of Danco Coast